General elections were held in Honduras to elect the President of Honduras, Vice-President, and deputies to the National Congress of Honduras on 27 November 2005. For the 2005 election the constitution was amended to create a single vice-president (Hondurans previously elected three 'presidential designates' on a ticket along with the presidential candidate). For the 2005 election the system of proportional representation was also changed from a closed list to an open list - the parties also used open-list primaries to select candidate slates. The list system reduced the re-election rate of incumbents, with just 31% of deputies in the new Congress having seats in the 2002–2006 Congress.

Primaries
Primary elections (internal party elections) were held for the first time in Honduras in this election, in February 2005. Only the Liberal Party and National Party participated in these elections, since the smaller parties lack significant factions. They were supervised by the official electoral body, and the 72-hour ban on the sale of alcohol which accompanies all official elections was also imposed over that weekend. 45% of the electorate voted in the primaries: 24% for the Liberals and 21% for the National Party. According to the Country Report quoted in the U.C. San Diego Library Latin American election results, "The low participation rate in the primaries . . . is a reflection of the lack of public faith in Honduras's political institutions and leaders." The electoral law requirement that women comprise at least 30% of candidates was not fulfilled by any faction in the primaries.

Campaign
There were five presidential candidates; Carlos Sosa Coello (Innovation and Unity Party), Porfirio Pepe Lobo (National Party), Manuel Zelaya (Liberal Party), Juan Almendares (Democratic Unification Party) and Juan Ramón Martínez (Christian Democrats).

Porfirio Pepe Lobo led by a wide margin for much of the campaign. "However, as the contest got dirtier, Zelaya — who was on the receiving end of more of the negative campaigning (portraying him as corrupt and incapable of running the country) — benefited from popular support for the underdog."

Analyses after the election concluded that many National Party supporters stayed at home, confident of Lobo's victory, while the Liberal Party got its supporters to the polls.

Results

President
According to an exit poll published by a local TV channel, Zelaya was ahead by 50.6 percent, against Lobo's 44.3%. However, Lobo, the National Party candidate did not accept the result of the election, arguing that the figures his own party had actually put him ahead in the race.  The National Party had asked for a vote recount, accusing the Supreme Electoral Tribunal, the country's top electoral authority, of having committed gross errors in the process and 48 hours later had not allegedly still not produced any official results.
Finally, after 10 days of waiting the National Party conceded the elections to Manuel Zelaya, the Liberal Party candidate and now, the president elect.

By department

National Congress
Zelaya's Liberal Party also emerged victorious in the parliamentary election, winning 62 of the 128 seats.

References

Honduras
Elections in Honduras
2005 in Honduras
Presidential elections in Honduras
November 2005 events in North America